Veluthodu dam (Malayalam: വെളുത്തോട് അണക്കെട്ട് ) is a part of Kakkad Hydro Electric Project and is located in Seethathode panchayath of Ranni Taluk in Pathanamthitta District of Kerala, India. Its a Concrete-Gravity dam built across the Veluthodu river, a tributary of Kakkad River which is again a tributary of Pamba River The dam is built primarily for electricity.  
This diversion dam diverts water to the water conductor system from Moozhiyar reservoir to Kakkad Power Station. This power station utilises the tail race water from Sabarigiri power station and flow received from moozhiyar and velluthode rivers. After power generation, water from Kakkad power station is released to the Kakkad River. Taluks through which release flow are Ranni, Konni, Kozhencherry, Thiruvalla, Chengannur, Kuttanadu, Mavelikara and Karthikappally It is operated by Kerala State Electricity Board.

Specifications
Latitude : 9⁰ 18′ 10 ” N
Longitude: 77⁰ 02′ 30” E
Village : Seethathodu
Panchayath : Seethathodu
District : Pathanamthitta
River Basin : Pamba 
River : Veluthode ar
Release from Dam to river : Kakkad river
Name of Project : Kakkad HEP 
Year of completion : 1990 
Type of Dam : Concrete – Gravity
Classification : MH (Medium Height)
Maximum Water Level (MWL)EL 195.00 m
Full Reservoir Level ( FRL) : EL 192.00 m
Storage at FRL : 0.67 Mm3
Height from deepest foundation : 20.50 m
Length : 107.00 m
Spillway : Ungated- Overflow section
Crest LevelEL  : 192.00 m
River Outlet : 1 No. 1.80 x 2.70 m
Purpose of Project : Hydro Power
Reservoir Capacity : 0.18 billion gallon / (0.67 million cubic meter)

Reservoir
The reservoir is formed by the Veluthodu dam, constructed across Velluthode river.
Water Spread Area : 0.0635 Sq. km.
Full Reservoir Level (FRL) : 192 m
Minimum Drawdown level (MDDL) : 186 m
 Effective Storage at FRL : 0.607 MCM
 Energy Equivalent at FRL : 0.187 MU

Kakkad Hydro Electric Project
The Kakkad Hydroelectric Project generates 50 MW of electricity using 2 turbines of 25 MW each year. The annual output is 262 MU. The machine was commissioned on 16 September 1999.  The Moozhiyar Dam creates the main reservoir of this project. the second reservoir is formed by the Veluthodu dam. After power generation, water from Kakkad power station is released to the Kakkad River. The prime mover is a vertical shaft francis Turbine.

The Kakkad project had a long tale of unending woes of corruption and trade union militancy.

References

Dams in Kerala
Dams completed in 1990
20th-century architecture in India